Tiki Tower is a thin  tall sandstone pinnacle located in the Airport Tower/Monster Tower/Washer Woman area of the Island in the Sky District of Canyonlands National Park, in San Juan County, Utah. It is situated one-half mile northwest of Airport Tower, and is composed of Wingate Sandstone, which is the remains of wind-borne sand dunes deposited approximately 200 million years ago in the Late Triassic. Access to this tower is via the four-wheel-drive White Rim Road. The top of this spire rises 1,100 feet above the road in a little more than one mile. Precipitation runoff from Tiki Tower drains southeast into the nearby Colorado River via Buck and Lathrop Canyons. The first ascent of Tiki Tower was made in November 1991 by Jeff Widen and Mitch Allen, via Brave Little Toaster (5.11, 3 pitches), with Fred Lifton and Paul Frank working the first pitch.

Climate
Spring and fall are the most favorable seasons to visit Tiki Tower. According to the Köppen climate classification system, it is located in a Cold semi-arid climate zone, which is defined by the coldest month having an average mean temperature below 0 °C (32 °F) and at least 50% of the total annual precipitation being received during the spring and summer.

See also
 Colorado Plateau
 Geology of the Canyonlands area

References

External links
 Canyonlands National Park National Park Service
 Tiki Tower weather forecast: National Weather Service
 Tiki Tower rock climbing: Mountainproject.com
Landforms of San Juan County, Utah
Colorado Plateau
Canyonlands National Park
Sandstone formations of the United States
Rock formations of Utah